Sandra Anderson may refer to:
Sandra L. Anderson, airplane pilot with Northwest Airlines
Sandra Anderson, character in Wilby Wonderful
Sandra Anderson, character in Legion
Sandra Anderson, sailor in 2011 Dragon World Championships
Sandra Lynn Anderson, Citizens for Constitutional Freedom militant in the occupation of the Malheur National Wildlife Refuge
Sondra Locke (actually Sandra Anderson, 1944–2018), American actress